Ikermiut is a former settlement in Avannaata municipality in northwestern Greenland. It was located on Ikermiut Island in the center of Inussulik Bay, a bay in the northern part of Upernavik Archipelago. The settlement was abandoned in 1954 in favor of more northerly settlements of Nuussuaq and Kullorsuaq, due to rough sea waves of Inussulik Bay overflowing the island.

References 

Former populated places in Greenland
Inussulik Bay
Upernavik Archipelago